The twist-beam rear suspension (also torsion-beam axle, deformable torsion beam or compound crank)  is a type of automobile suspension based on a large H or C-shaped member.  The front of the H attaches to the body via rubber bushings, and the rear of the H carries each stub-axle assembly, on each side of the car.  The cross beam of the H holds the two trailing arms together, and provides the roll stiffness of the suspension, by twisting as the two trailing arms move vertically, relative to each other.

Functioning
The coil springs usually bear on a pad alongside the stub-axle.  Often the shock is colinear with the spring forming a coil-over. In many cases the damper is also used as a restraint strap to stop the arm descending so far that the coil spring falls out through being completely unloaded.  This location gives a high motion ratio compared with most suspensions, improving performance.

The longitudinal location of the cross beam controls important parameters of the suspension's behavior, such as the roll steer curve and toe and camber compliance.  The closer the cross beam to the axle stubs the more the camber and toe changes under deflection.  A key difference between the camber and toe changes of a twist beam vs independent suspension is the change in camber and toe is dependent on the position of the other wheel, not the car's chassis.  In a traditional independent suspension the camber and toe are based on the position of the wheel relative to the body. With twist-beam if both wheels compress together their camber and toe will not change.  Thus if both wheels started perpendicular to the road and are compressed together they will stay perpendicular to the road.  The camber and toe changes are the result of one wheel being compressed relative to the other.

Uses 

This suspension is commonly used on a wide variety of front wheel drive cars (mainly compacts and subcompacts), and was almost ubiquitous on European superminis. When Volkswagen-Audi changed from rear engined RR layout cars to front wheel drive FF layout cars in the mid-1970s, it adopted the system across not just its Audi 50 / Volkswagen Polo supermini, but also the compact-hatchback Volkswagen Golf and Scirocco models.

This type of suspension is usually described as semi-independent, meaning that the two wheels can move relative to each other, but their motion is still somewhat inter-linked, to a greater extent than in a true independent rear suspension (IRS). This can mildly compromise the handling and ride quality of the vehicle. For this reason, some manufacturers have changed to different linkage designs. As an example, in 2004, Volkswagen dropped the twist-beam in favour of a true IRS for the Volkswagen Golf Mk5, possibly in response to its rival, the Ford Focus's "Control Blade" multi-link rear suspension introduced in 1999 - a first use of multi-link suspension in the segment. It came back on a twist-bean later for small engines equipped MK6 and MK7 Golf. General Motors in Europe (Vauxhall and Opel) continued to use twist- or torsion- beam suspension up to the end of GM's ownership of the brand, and it was used on the 1982-1988 Cadillac Cimarron, Oldsmobile Firenza and Buick Skyhawk. The twist-beam provided a cost saving of €100 per car compared to multi-link rear suspension, although the version used in the 2009-2018 Opel Astra also employed a Watts linkage at a cost of €20 to address the drawbacks and provide a competitive and cost-effective rear suspension.
Other competitors, the Renault Mégane, Peugeot 308 and Citroen C4 also have stayed with the twist beam.
The sportiest models of its brands, such as the Renault Mégane RS and the Peugeot 308 II GTi, have proven that twist-beam rear suspension can provide a high level of performance on a compact car, on the racetrack, but also during the Moose test.
The Peugeot 308 II was able to outperform its competitors equipped with multi-link rear axles by passing this test at 82 km/h.
Only 3 km/h less than the Citroën Xantia Activa's world record of 85 km/h in 1999.
Kia Soul is also using twist beam, although the larger Hyundai Elantra (HD) and Hyundai i30 models employed either a torsion beam or a true multi-link independent rear suspension depending on market.

Advantages
Low cost
Can be durable
Fewer bushings than multi-link suspension that are less stressed and less prone to wear
Simple
Neat package, reduces clutter under floor
Fairly light weight
Springs and shocks can be light and low cost
May not need a separate anti-roll bar, as the axle itself may be made to perform that function, up to a point
Road handling can be excellent, often to the detriment of comfort (examples : Honda Civic Type R FK2, Suzuki Swift Sport, Renault Clio III RS, Peugeot 308 II GTi)

Disadvantages
Basic toe vs lateral force characteristic is oversteer
Since toe characteristics may be unsuitable, adding toe-control bushings may be expensive.
Camber characteristics are very limited.
Not very easy to adjust for reduced roll stiffness, but increasing is easily done by adding an anti-roll bar
Welds see a lot of fatigue, may need a lot of development
Not much recession compliance - can be poor for impact harshness, and will cause unwelcome toe changes (steer effects)
Wheel moves forward as it rises, can also be poor for impact harshness (this can be negated by designing the beam with the mounts higher than the stub axles, which impacts on the floorpan height, and causes more roll oversteer)
Need to package room for exhaust and so on past the cross beam
Camber compliance may be high
No redress for wheel alignment. Alignment geometry is factory-set and not generally adjustable. Any deviation from factory specifications/tolerances could mean a bent axle or compromised mounting points.

References

External links
A picture of a twist beam

Automotive suspension technologies